In mathematics, a Ringel–Hall algebra is a generalization of the Hall algebra, studied by . It has a basis of equivalence classes of objects of an abelian category, and the structure constants for this basis are related to the numbers of extensions of objects in the category.

References

External links

Representation theory
Lie algebras
Symmetric functions